Stephen John Fossey is a British astronomer working at UCL Observatory, which is part of University College London (UCL). He is one of the three editors of The Observatory magazine.

Fossey's research interests are in the interstellar medium, exoplanets and time-domain astronomy. Along with Ingo Waldmann and David Kipping, Fossey discovered in 2009 that the exoplanet HD 80606b (previously known from radial velocity) transits its host star. Fossey also discovered supernova SN 2014J, the closest supernova for each for several decades, in January 2014.

Education
Fossey studied at University College London (UCL), receiving his Bachelor of Science with Honours in 1983. This was followed in 1990 by a PhD in Astronomy (also at UCL). Fossey later became a member of staff at ULO (University of London Observatory).

Research and publications
The areas of research that Fossey takes most interest in are extrasolar planets, the interstellar medium, and molecular astrophysics. He has authored over a dozen refereed scientific papers on these topics. His first scientific publication was a single-author letter in Nature.

Fossey is an editor of The Observatory magazine.

References

Academics of University College London
Alumni of University College London
British physicists
21st-century British astronomers
Living people
Year of birth missing (living people)